Colubraria maculosa is a species of sea snail, a marine gastropod mollusk in the family Colubrariidae.

Description

Distribution
This species is found in the seas around Madagascar and Mauritius.

References

 Dautzenberg, Ph. (1929). Mollusques testaces marins de Madagascar. Faune des Colonies Francaises, Tome III

External links
 Gmelin J.F. (1791). Vermes. In: Gmelin J.F. (Ed.) Caroli a Linnaei Systema Naturae per Regna Tria Naturae, Ed. 13. Tome 1(6). G.E. Beer, Lipsiae [Leipzig. pp. 3021-3910]

Colubrariidae
Gastropods described in 1790
Taxa named by Johann Friedrich Gmelin